Prior to the establishment of the State of Israel in 1948, the Yishuv was involved in several armed conflicts as part of the Intercommunal conflict in Mandatory Palestine:
 1920 Nebi Musa riots – Arab riots against Jews in and around the Old City of Jerusalem.
 1921 Jaffa riots – Arab riots against Jews in the city of Jaffa.
 1929 Hebron–Safed riots – Arab demonstrations and riots against Jews in all Mandatory Palestine, whose major violent episodes took place in Hebron and Safed.
 1933 Palestine riots – during massive Arab demonstrations and riots held in Mandatory Palestine the demonstrators attempted to break into the Jewish area of Jerusalem but were successfully dispersed by the British police forces.
 1936–1939 Arab revolt – Arab violent uprising against mass Jewish immigration and British authorities.
 1944–1947 Jewish insurgency – Violent events, which occurred between Revolt declaration by Irgun in February 1944 and the UN partition plan on 29 November 1947, when the British government policy of limiting Jewish immigration to Mandatory Palestine led to conflict between the British Empire and Zionist organizations in Mandatory Palestine, some of which resorted to armed revolt.
 1947–1948 Civil War – This period constitutes the first phase of the 1947–1949 Palestine war, during which the Jewish and Arab communities of Palestine clashed.

See also

 List of wars involving Israel
 Israeli–Palestinian conflict

References

Lists of wars by country
History of Mandatory Palestine
United Kingdom military-related lists
Military history of Israel
Jews and Judaism in Mandatory Palestine
Jewish military history
Intercommunal conflict in Mandatory Palestine